Beijing Symphony Orchestra (Simplified Chinese: 北京交响乐团), founded in 1977, is a symphony orchestra in based in Beijing, China.

One of its best-known performances was an unfolding of Chinese history and culture performed at Badaling in the Great Wall which was transmitted internationally via satellite.

Conductors
 Jin Xiang 1979–1984.

References

External links 
 Beijing Symphony Orchestra
List of Symphony Orchestras in Greater China -PRC. HKSAR. Macao SAR and Taiwan

Musical groups established in 1977
China orchestras
Culture in Beijing
1977 establishments in China